Madhavaneni Raghunandan Rao (born 23 March 1968) is an Indian politician from Telangana state and an MLA from Dubbaka. He is a strong supporter of Telangana state ideology. He is a lawyer by profession. He hails from Medak district.

Early life and education 

Rao was born at Siddipet to M. Bhagavantha Rao. He earned a B.Sc. degree at Siddipet Degree College, completed a L.L.B. degree at Osmania University, Hyderabad, a B.Ed. degree from Karnataka University, and a post-graduate diploma in human rights from Central University of Hyderabad.

After completing his education, Rao relocated from Siddipet to Patancheru, an industrial area, in 1991 and joined a reputed Telugu daily newspaper Eenadu as a news contributor for five years. He subsequently, enrolled as an advocate in the bar association of the High Court of Andhra Pradesh.

Professional career 
He started his career as a lawyer. He is well known for handling Hyderabad MP Asaduddin Owaisi's bail petition.

Political career 
Rao started his political career as a Telangana Rashtra Samithi member. He was with Telangana Rashtra Samithi from 27 April 2001. He is the politburo member and Medak district convenor. On 14 May 2013 he was suspended from the Telangana Rashtra Samithi party on allegations of meeting with Telugu Desam Party president N. Chandrababu Naidu which he actively denied. Subsequently, he joined BJP and contested the Legislative Assembly elections from Dubbak constituency of Telangana state in the year 2014. He is state party secretary and MLA of Bharatiya Janata Party in Telangana. Currently he is Member of Legislative Assembly in Telangana Dubbak in 2020 by-poll election by a margin of 1,074 votes, after death of Solipeta Ramalinga Reddy.

Rape accusation 
The police said, a 47-year-old woman made a complaint in February 2020 claiming that she was raped in 2007 by advocate M Raghunandan Rao, following which a rape case was filed against him. She claimed the advocate called her to his Patancheru office in 2007 and offered coffee mixed with some substances and "raped" her when she became unconscious while she filed a harassment case against her husband and maintenance case through Advocate Rao. The police said, the woman claimed in the complaint that the advocate had threatened to post photos taken in compromising positions on Social networks. Rao has called the allegations false.

References

Telangana Rashtra Samithi politicians
Telugu people
Living people
People from Telangana
1968 births
Bharatiya Janata Party politicians from Telangana
Telangana MLAs 2018–2023